Bear Story (Spanish: Historia de un oso) is a 2014 Chilean animated short film, directed by Gabriel Osorio Vargas. The screenplay was co-written with Daniel Castro, and the film was produced by Pato Escala Pierart. The story is inspired by the director's grandfather, Leopoldo Osorio, who was imprisoned for two years after the Chilean coup d'état and then forced into exile for the duration of the dictatorship. The film was a critical success, winning the Oscar for Best Animated Short Film at the 88th Academy Awards. It is the first Chilean film to win an Academy Award and also the first Latin American animation to win or be nominated for an Oscar.

Plot
A bear works on a mechanical diorama that depicts a bear family - himself, a female bear, and a child bear. He carries the figures of the mother and child and looks into an empty child's room before having tea in his kitchen. As he checks the time, the bear puts the two figures into the diorama and cycles out to the village square. He sets up his diorama and announces his business by ringing a bell. A bear child notices him and, after receiving a coin from his father, runs to see the diorama.

The diorama shows the bear's life, starting with himself, his wife, and his child living happily together in an apartment. When a circus arrives, militant-looking figures wielding batons violently subdue and capture animal residents. The bear protects his family but is beaten and taken away. In the circus, he is forced to ride a small bicycle and is kept locked and chained in a cage. As other tricks are added to his act, such as juggling and riding a unicycle, he is required to perform a daredevil jump. Still thinking of his family, the bear performs the jump so well he flies out of the circus tent, escaping captivity and returning home. Weeping at the sight of his wrecked home, the bear's wife and child appear and hug him.

The diorama ends and the child gives the bear a coin, receiving a pinwheel from him before rushing off to return to their parent. The bear watches them go, glancing at the photograph of his family that he keeps in his pocket watch. He then rings his bell again.

Legacy 
Bear Story success inspired many animators in Chile, such as Fernanda Frick (Here's the Plan), who had worked on the film, and Hugo Covarrubias (Bestia, also Oscar-nominated) to create their own independent animated shorts.

See also
 Nahuel and the Magic Book

Accolades

References

External links
 
 Official Punkrobot site
 
 
 Official Trailer

2014 films
2014 animated films
2010s animated short films
Animated films without speech
Best Animated Short Academy Award winners
Chilean animated short films
2010s Spanish-language films
2014 short films
Films about bears